Eirenis levantinus is a species of snake in the family Colubridae .
It is found in Lebanon, Syria, and Turkey.
Its natural habitats are Mediterranean-type shrubby vegetation, plantations, and rural gardens.
It is threatened by habitat loss.

They are insectivores and are among the few snakes that eat a diet consisting entirely of insects and worms. In the wild, they consume a variety of prey such as crickets, moths, grasshoppers, caterpillars, fly larvae, spiders, and worms.

References

Eirenis
Reptiles described in 1993
Taxonomy articles created by Polbot
Reptiles of Turkey